Verbena menthifolia is a species of verbena known by the common name mint-leaved vervain or mint vervain. It is native to the southwestern United States and northern Mexico, where it occurs in many types of open, dry habitat such as desert scrub. This perennial herb produces one or more rough-haired, erect stems up to about 75 centimeters in maximum height. The hairy leaves are a few centimeters long and are divided near the base into a few narrow lobes which have serrated edges. The inflorescence is made up of one to three narrow, erect spikes of flowers up to 30 centimeters long. The flowers are spaced, not densely packed on the slender spike. Each flower has a small purple corolla 2 or 3 millimeters wide.

References

External links
Jepson Manual Treatment
Photo gallery

menthifolia
Flora of California
Flora of Baja California
Flora of the Sonoran Deserts
Flora of the California desert regions
Natural history of the California chaparral and woodlands
Natural history of the Colorado Desert
Natural history of the Peninsular Ranges
Taxa named by George Bentham
Flora without expected TNC conservation status